Dubthach is a masculine personal name in early Ireland. It may refer to:

 Dubthach Dóeltenga, a character in the Ulster Cycle, ally of Fergus
 Dubthach maccu Lugair, legendary Irish poet and lawyer in the time of St Patrick
 Dubthach the First, Bishop of Armagh, Ireland from 497 to 513.
 Dubthach the Second, Bishop of Armagh, Ireland from 536 to 548

See also
 Duffy (surname)
 Saint Duthac